Jrarrat or Jrarat or Djrarat or Dzhrarat may refer to:
Jrarat, Armavir, Armenia
Jrarat, Kotayk, Armenia
Jrarat, Shirak, Armenia